Sir William Russell, 1st Baronet, of Wytley (ca. 1602 – 30 November 1669), was an English politician who sat in the House of Commons in 1625. He was an officer in the Royalist army during the English Civil War and, as Governor of Worcester, he refused entry to the Parliamentary cavalry shortly before the Battle of Powick Bridge (22 September 1642) — the first cavalry skirmish of the Civil War.

Biography
Russell was the son of Sir Thomas Russell of Strensham and his wife Elizabeth Spencer, daughter of Sir William Spencer. He was educated at Wadham College, Oxford (1620) and trained in the law at the Middle Temple (1622).

In 1625 Russell was elected Member of Parliament (MP) for Worcestershire. He was created baronet of Wytley on 12 March 1627. The manor of Great Witley passed out of the family, sold by his son Thomas during his lifetime.

Russell was appointed to the Worcestershire bench as a Justice of the Peace from 1633 to 1646 and from 1660 until his death. He was High Sheriff of Worcestershire for 1635 and 1642–43. He was the Governor of Worcester (1642–1643).

Family
Russell married Frances Reade, daughter of Sir Thomas Reade of Barton, Berkshire and his wife Mary Brockett, daughter of Sir John Brocket of Brocket Hall, Hertfordshire and had thirteen children. He was succeeded by his son Francis.

Samuel Butler a poet who wrote Hudibras was brought up in Russell's house and became his clerk.

Notes

References
 
 
 
 

1602 births
1669 deaths
Alumni of Wadham College, Oxford
Members of the Middle Temple
Baronets in the Baronetage of England
English MPs 1625
High Sheriffs of Worcestershire
Members of the Parliament of England for Worcestershire